The 2014–15 Boise State Broncos women's basketball team represented Boise State University during the 2014–15 NCAA Division I women's basketball season. The Broncos, led by tenth year head coach Gordy Presnell, played their home games at Taco Bell Arena and were a member of the Mountain West Conference. They finished the season 22–11, 11–7 in Mountain West play for a finish in fourth place. They were also champions of the 2015 Mountain West Conference women's basketball tournament and earn an automatic trip to the 2015 NCAA Division I women's basketball tournament where they lost in the first round to Tennessee.

Roster

Schedule

|-
!colspan=9 style="background:#143D99; color:#FF6600;"| Exhibition

|-
!colspan=9 style="background:#143D99; color:#FF6600;"| Regular Season

|-
!colspan=9 style="background:#143D99; color:#FF6600;"| Mountain West Women's Tournament

|-
!colspan=9 style="background:#143D99; color:#FF6600;"| NCAA Women's Tournament

See also
2014–15 Boise State Broncos men's basketball team

References

Boise State Broncos women's basketball seasons
Boise State
Boise State
Boise
Boise